Jholabibi is a Hindu goddess and folk deity in Bengal, worshipped in conjunction with the Goddesses Oladevi (the Goddess of Cholera), Ajgaibibi, Chandbibi, Bahadabibi, Jhetunebibi and Asanbibi.

References

Hinduism in Bangladesh
Regional Hindu goddesses
Hindu folk deities